Playlist is the seventh studio album by American singer Babyface. It was released by Mercury Records on September 18, 2007 in the United States. His debut with the then-newly re-launched label, Playlist consists of eight covers of folk and soft rock songs and two original compositions. The album reached the top ten on the US Top R&B/Hip-Hop Albums. Its lead single, the James Taylor cover "Fire and Rain," became a hit on the US Adult Contemporary chart.

Critical reception

AllMusic editor Andy Kellman found that Babyface "put a lot of heart and soul into the material, all of which connected with him as a youngster listening to '70s AM radio [...] Apart from Bob Dylan's "Knockin' on Heaven's Door," everything is suited for Babyface, often to the point where the songs don't sound tremendously different from what he has written during the last several years [...] n addition to the eight covers, there are two new songs, both of which fit into the album's scheme sonically while being far from lightweight subject-wise."

Track listing
All track were produced by Babyface.

Personnel
Credits adapted from the album's liner notes.

Performers and musicians

Babyface – composer, keyboard, drum programming, acoustic guitar, bass
Sasha Allen – background vocals 
Brandy – background vocals 
Eric Clapton – composer 
Jim Croce – composer 
Bob Dylan – composer 
Ethan Farmer – bass 
Dan Fogelberg – composer 
Brian Frasier Moore – drums
David Gates – composer
Rob Lewis – Fender Rhodes, piano, Wurlitzer 
Doug Livingston – guitar (steel) 
Dave Loggins – composer 
Rafael Padilla – percussion 
Dean Parks – acoustic guitar 
Greg Phillinganes – piano 
Michael Ripoll – acoustic guitar 
Keith Slettedahl – background vocals

Technical

Babyface – producer
Paul Boutin – recording and mixing engineer
James Minchin – photography 
Herb Powers – mastering

Charts

References

2007 albums
Babyface (musician) albums
Covers albums
Mercury Records albums
Albums produced by Babyface (musician)